The 11×58mmR M1877, 11mm Werndl or 11.15×58mmR is a black powder cartridge used in the M1867 Werndl–Holub rifle as well as the Mannlicher M1886 rifle.

References

Pistol and rifle cartridges
Rimmed cartridges